Michaela Nosková (born 21 February 1983 in Brno) was the runner-up on television contest Česko hledá SuperStar (the Czech version of Pop Idol) in 2005. Her placing in that competition launched her career as a pop singer, recording artist and musical theater star in the Czech Republic.

She is a soloist in Prague's historic Karlin theatre performing lead roles in various musicals such as Jekyll & Hyde, The Producers and the operetta Czardasz Princess. She was also featured in Les Misérables  at the Goja Music Hall in Prague. Noskova is emerging as a prolific recording artist with several best-selling CDs in her home country.

Personal data
Michaela was born on 21 February 1983 in Brno, Czech Republic.

Discography
Albums
Cesko hledá SuperStar Top 12 (June 2005)
Bez Milosti (October 2005)
1983 (Mai 2008)
Link for cd 1983(in Czech)

DVDs
Nekdo Se Dívá DVD (October 2005)

Book's
Já jsem já (October 2005)

Photos
External links
Official Website of Míša Nosková(in Czech)English Website of Misa Noskova

1983 births
Czech television personalities
Living people
People from Brno
21st-century Czech women singers
Idols (franchise) participants